GTR – FIA GT Racing Game is a sports car racing simulator developed by SimBin Studios (later Sector3 Studios) and published by 10tacle Publishing for the x86 PC. Simbin has also released an "add-on pack" called "Kings of Ovals" which contains a set of new oval-style tracks. A sequel, GTR 2 – FIA GT Racing Game, was released in 2006.

Reception
GameSpot said: "Despite its blemishes, GTR is the breath of fresh air this genre so badly needed". They awarded the game a score of 8.8 (Great). IGN.com also praised the game: "Big claims come close to reality". IGN.com gave a score of 8.5 (Great).

GTR won PC Gamer USs "Best Racing Game 2005" award. The magazine's Andy Mahood wrote: "With its licensed field of exotic sports and GT machines, exquisitely rendered European circuits, and outstanding vehicle physics, GTR advanced the technology of racing simulations to hitherto unseen levels". It was also a runner-up for Computer Games Magazines list of the top 10 computer games of 2005.

References

External links
 GTR at MobyGames
 

10tacle Studios games
2005 video games
Atari games
Cancelled Xbox 360 games
FIA GT Championship
Multiplayer and single-player video games
Racing simulators
Racing video games
SimBin Studios games
Video games developed in Sweden
Video games scored by Stephen Baysted
Video games with expansion packs
Windows games
Windows-only games